Discs large homolog 1 (DLG1), also known as synapse-associated protein 97 or SAP97, is a scaffold protein that in humans is encoded by the SAP97 gene.

SAP97 is a mammalian MAGUK-family member protein that is similar to the Drosophila protein Dlg1 (the protein is alternatively referred to as hDlg1, and the human gene is DLG1).  SAP97 is expressed throughout the body in epithelial cells.  In the brain it is involved in the trafficking of ionotropic receptors from the endoplasmic reticulum to the plasma membrane, and may be involved in the trafficking AMPAR during synaptic plasticity.

Function 
SAP97 is expressed throughout the body in epithelial cells, including the kidney and brain.  There is some evidence that SAP97 regulates cell-to-cell adhesion during cell death, and may interact with HPV.  In the brain, SAP97's function is involved in the trafficking of transmembrane receptors from the ER to the plasma membrane.

SAP97's function has been investigated by reducing its expression by knockout or increasing its expression heterologously.  Mice in which the SAP97 gene has been knocked out die perinatally, have a cleft palate, and deficiencies in renal function. Overexpression of SAP97 in mammalian neurons leads to increased synaptic strength.

Clinical significance 
Mutations in DLG1 are associated to Crohn's Disease.

Structure 
SAP97's protein structure consists of an alternatively-spliced n-terminal domain, three PDZ domains, an SH3 domain, hook domain, I3 domain, and finally an inactive guanylate kinase (GK) domain.  Each of these domains has specific interacting partners that help define SAP97's unique function.

The n-terminal of SAP97 can be alternatively spliced to contain a double-cysteine/palmitoylation site (α-isoform), or an L27 domain (β-isoform.  The L27 domain is involved in SAP97 oligomerization with other SAP97 molecules, CASK, and other L27-domain-containing proteins.  There is also a myosin VI binding site near n-terminal which may be involved in the internalization of AMPAR.

Each of SAP97's PDZ domains have different binding partners, including the AMPAR subunit GluR1 for the first PDZ domain, and neuroligin for the last.  SAP97's I3 domain is unique to SAP97 among the MAGUK family, and is known to regulate the post-synaptic localization of SAP97 and to bind the protein 4.1N.  The GK domain allows SAP97 to bind to GKAP/SAPAP-family proteins.

References

Further reading

External links 
 Drosophila discs large 1 - The Interactive Fly